{{DISPLAYTITLE:Technetium (99mTc) mertiatide}}

Technetium (99mTc) mertiatide  is a radiopharmaceutical medication used in nuclear medicine to image the kidneys. It is a is a renal imaging agent that is given by intravenous injection.

It was approved for medical use in the United States in June 1990.

Medical uses 
Technetium (99mTc) mertiatide is indicated for use in the diagnosis of congenital and acquired abnormalities, renal failure, urinary tract obstruction, and calculi.

Chemistry 
The active ingredient, betiatide, is reconstituted with sodium pertechnetate 99mTc injection to form technetium (99mTc) mertiatide.

References 

 
Radiopharmaceuticals